Zakolpye is a rural locality (a selo) in Grigoryevskoye Rural Settlement, Gus-Khrustalny District, Vladimir Oblast, Russia. The population was 475 as of 2010. There are 3 streets.

Geography 
Zakolpye is located on the right bank of the Kolp River, 36 km southeast of Gus-Khrustalny (the district's administrative centre) by road. Grigoryevo is the nearest rural locality.

References 

Rural localities in Gus-Khrustalny District
Melenkovsky Uyezd